Sri Lanka is a tropical island situated close to the southern tip of India. The invertebrate fauna is as large as it is common to other regions of the world. There are about 2 million species of arthropods found in the world, and still it is counting. So many new species are discover up to this time also. So it is very complicated and difficult to summarize the exact number of species found within a certain region.

The following list provide the scorpions in Sri Lanka.

Scorpions
Phylum: Arthropoda   Class: Arachnida
Order: Scorpiones

Scorpions are easily identified by their large pedipalas and curved tail above the head. There are about 1,750 species of scorpions described within 13 families. Sri Lanka is home for 20 scorpions under 4 families and 9 genera. Whilst all scorpions are venomous, only one species native to Sri Lanka is fatal to humans. During the field survey conducted throughout the country in 2016, new species have been identified and species belong to subgenus Reddyanus was elevated into genus level and removed them from the genus Isometrus.

Family: Buthidae - Fat-tailed scorpions
 Buthoscorpio sarasinorum – - Endemic
 Charmus laneaus – - Endemic
 Charmus saradieli – - Endemic
 Hottentotta tamulus - only dangerously venomous scorpion in Sri Lanka 
 Isometrus maculatus 
 Isometrus thwaitesi - Endemic
 Lychas srilankanensis - Endemic
 Reddyanus basilicus - Endemic
 Reddyanus besucheti - Endemic
 Reddyanus ceylonensis - Endemic
 Reddyanus jayarathnei - Endemic
 Reddyanus loebli - Endemic
 Reddyanus ranawanai - Endemic

Family: Chaerilidae 
 Chaerilus ceylonensis - Endemic

Family: Hormuridae 
 Liocheles australasiae

Family: Scorpionidae 
 Heterometrus gravimanus - Endemic
 Heterometrus indus
 Heterometrus serratus - Endemic
 Heterometrus swammerdami
 Heterometrus yaleensis - Endemic

References

 
 http://www.ceylontoday.lk/18-27488-news-detail-gorgeous-but-deadly.html
 http://srilanka.for91days.com/tag/scorpions/
 http://www.azscorpion.com/SriLan.html

 
.Sri Lanka
Sri Lanka
Scorpions